"Les yeux au ciel" (meaning "Looking up to the Sky") is a song recorded by Canadian singer Celine Dion, released on 14 April 2017 as the fourth single in France from Encore un soir (2016). The lyrics were written by Grand Corps Malade and the music was composed by Mutine (Manon Romiti and Silvio Lisbonne) and Florent Mothe. Lisbonne handled the production with Tiborg serving as an additional producer.

Commercial performance
In early September 2016, after the release of Encore un soir, "Les yeux au ciel" entered the French Digital Singles Chart at number 168 and the French Overall Singles Chart at number 169. It stayed on both charts for three weeks. On 20 June 2017, "Les yeux au ciel" entered the Canadian Adult Contemporary chart at number fifty. On 4 July 2017, it reached number forty-three.

Live performances
On 7 September 2016, Dion performed "Les yeux au ciel" for the very first time on television on M6's Music Show – 100% tubes 2016 in France. On 1 October 2016, she also performed it on Le Grand Show on France 2. Both shows were recorded in June 2016, while Dion was touring France with her Summer Tour 2016.

Credits and personnel
Recording
Recorded at Studio at the Palms (Las Vegas), Angel Studio (London), RAK Studios (London), Studio des Charmettes, Studio Tick Tone Music, Studio Plearmusic, Studio TMP Recordings, Oldbnb Studio
Mixed at Lionshare Studios (Los Angeles)

Personnel

Grand Corps Malade – songwriting (lyrics)
Manon Romiti – songwriting (music)
Silvio Lisbonne – songwriting (music), production, executive producer, recording, programming, keyboards, piano, acoustic guitar, electric guitar, bass, drums
Florent Mothe – songwriting (music)
Tiborg – additional production, recording, programming, keyboards, electric guitar, drums
Celine Dion – lead and backing vocals
Simon Hale – conductor, strings arrangement, piano
Isobel Griffiths – contractor
Everton Nelson – strings leader
Eddy Pradelles – acoustic guitar, recording
Pierre-Luc Rioux – acoustic guitar, electric guitar, recording
Earl Harvin – drums
Rob Brinkmann – recording
Wes "Wesonator" Maebe – recording
Chris Parker – recording
Mat Bartram – recording
Humberto Gatica – vocal recording, mix

Charts

Release history

References

External links

2016 songs
2017 singles
Celine Dion songs
French-language songs
Songs written by Manon Romiti
Songs written by Silvio Lisbonne